The Military ranks of Equatorial Guinea are the military insignia used by the Armed Forces of Equatorial Guinea. Being a former colony of Spain, Equatorial Guinea shares a rank structure similar to that of Spain.

Commissioned officer ranks
The rank insignia of commissioned officers.

Other ranks
The rank insignia of non-commissioned officers and enlisted personnel.

References

External links
 

Equatorial Guinea
Ranks